Richard de Clyve was an English medieval university chancellor.

Richard de Clyve was at Merton College, Oxford. He was elected as Chancellor of the University of Oxford between 1297 and 1300. He may have been Abbot of Abingdon.

References

Year of birth unknown
Year of death unknown
Fellows of Merton College, Oxford
Chancellors of the University of Oxford
13th-century English people
14th-century English people
13th-century English writers
14th-century English writers